Sessums Glacier is a glacier flowing into the head of Henry Inlet on the north side of Thurston Island.

It was named by the Advisory Committee on Antarctic Names after US Navy Lieutenant Commander Walter Sessums.  Sessums was a helicopter pilot in the Eastern Group of Operation Highjump, which obtained aerial photographs of Thurston Island and adjacent coastal areas over the Antarctic summer of 1946–47.

See also
 List of glaciers in the Antarctic
 Glaciology

Maps
 Thurston Island – Jones Mountains. 1:500000 Antarctica Sketch Map. US Geological Survey, 1967.
 Antarctic Digital Database (ADD). Scale 1:250000 topographic map of Antarctica. Scientific Committee on Antarctic Research (SCAR). Since 1993, regularly upgraded and updated.

References
 

Glaciers of Thurston Island